Norway was represented by Odd Børre, with the song "Stress", at the 1968 Eurovision Song Contest, which took place on 6 April in London.

"Stress" originally finished second in the 1968 Melodi Grand Prix on 3 March, but was promoted to the Norwegian entry when the winning song "Jeg har aldri vært så glad i noen som deg" was withdrawn from the contest by its composer amid persistent allegations that it plagiarised the 1963 hit "Summer Holiday" by Cliff Richard – who was the United Kingdom's representative in the 1968 contest.

Before Eurovision

Melodi Grand Prix 1968 

Melodi Grand Prix 1968 was held at the studios of broadcaster NRK in Oslo, hosted by Jan Voigt.

Five performers and songs took part in the final with each song sung twice by different singers, once with a small combo and once with a full orchestra. The winning song was chosen by voting from ten regional juries.

At Eurovision 
On the night of the final Børre performed 13th in the running order, following the United Kingdom and preceding Ireland. Each national jury had 10 points to distribute between the songs, and at the close "Stress" had picked up 2 points (1 each from Luxembourg and Spain), placing Norway joint 13th (with Austria and Switzerland) of the 17 entries. The Norwegian jury awarded 6 of its 10 points to Sweden.

Voting

References 

1968
Countries in the Eurovision Song Contest 1968
1968
Eurovision
Eurovision